The Trophées UNFP du football are a number of awards given annually by the National Union of Professional Football Players to players playing in France's Ligue 1 and Ligue 2, as well as to managers and referees, the most prestigious one being the Player of the Year.

Created in 1988 under the name Oscars du football, they were renamed in 2004 after a complaint by the Academy Awards committee. The ceremony has been broadcast live on Canal+ since 1994.

Ligue 1

Player of the Year

Young Player of the Year

Goalkeeper of the Year

Manager of the Year

Goal of the Year

Unlike the other awards, the best goal of the year is chosen by the public.

Best French Player playing Abroad

Team of the Year
Highlighted players had at least one prior appearance in Ligue 1's team of the year since 2003.

2002–03

2003–04

2004–05

2005–06

2006–07

2007–08

2008–09

2009–10

2010–11

2011–12

2012–13

2013–14

2014–15

2015–16

2016–17

2017–18

2018–19

2020–21

2021–22

Ligue 2

Player of the Year

Goalkeeper of the Year

Manager of the Year

Team of the Year
Highlighted players had at least one prior appearance in Ligue 2's team of the year since 2003.

2002–03

2003–04

2004–05

2005–06

2006–07

2007–08

2008–09

2009–10

2010–11

2011–12

2012–13

2013–14

2014–15

2015–16

2016–17

2017–18

2018–19

2020–21

2021–22

Division 1 Féminine

Player of the Year

Young Player of the Year

Goalkeeper of the Year

Team of the Year
Highlighted players had at least one prior appearance in Division 1 Féminine's team of the year since 2021.

2020–21

2021–22

Other awards

President of the Year

Referee of the Year
2002: Gilles Veissière
2003: Gilles Veissière, Nelly Viennot
2004: Bertrand Layec
2005: Bruno Coué, Patrick Lhermitte, Vincent Texier
2006: Éric Poulat, Lionel Dagorne, Vincent Texier
2007: Bertrand Layec
2008: Stéphane Lannoy
2009: Antony Gautier, Clément Turpin
2010: Stéphane Lannoy, Eric Dansault, Laurent Hugo
2011: Antony Gautier, Clément Turpin, Nicolas Pottier
2012: Stéphane Lannoy
2014: Ruddy Buquet
2019: Clément Turpin
2021: Clément Turpin, Cyril Gringore (Ligue 1), Bartolomeu Varela, Cyril Saint-Cricq (Ligue 2)
2022: Benoît Bastien, Cyril Gringore (Ligue 1), Olivier Thual, Stephan Pignatelli (Ligue 2)

UNFP Trophy of Honour
1996: Jean-Luc Ettori
2003: Alain Roche
2004: Laurent Blanc
2005: Marcel Desailly
2006: Lyon
2007: Zinedine Zidane
2008: France 98
2009: Lilian Thuram
2010: Claude Makélélé
2011: Just Fontaine, Michel Hidalgo, Philippe Piat, Sylvain Kastendeuch
2012: France women's national team
2013: Grégory Coupet
2014: Mickaël Landreau
2015: Eric Abidal
2016: France Euro 2000 team
2017: Raymond Kopa
2019: Didier Drogba

UNFP Special Trophy
2005: Corinne Diacre
2007: Nelly Viennot
2008: Just Fontaine
2012: Mathieu Bodmer
2013: Bernard Diomède
2014: Peace and Sport
2021: Corentin Tolisso
2022: Mamadou Sakho

UNFP 20 Year Special Team Trophy

See also

 List of sports awards honoring women
 UNFP Player of the Month

References

External links
 Palmarès - Trophées UNFP du Football on UNFP

Ligue 1 trophies and awards
Ligue 2 trophies and awards
Footballers in France
French football trophies and awards
1988 establishments in France
Awards established in 1988
Annual events in France
Women's association football trophies and awards
Association football player non-biographical articles